The 2nd Magritte Awards ceremony, presented by the Académie André Delvaux, honored the best films of 2011 in Belgium and took place on February 4, 2012, at the Square in the historic site of Mont des Arts, Brussels beginning at 7:45 p.m. CET. During the ceremony, the Académie André Delvaux presented Magritte Awards in 21 categories. The ceremony was televised in Belgium by BeTV. Film director Bertrand Tavernier presided the ceremony, while actress Helena Noguerra hosted the show for the second time.

The nominees for the 2nd Magritte Awards were announced on January 10, 2012. Films with the most nominations were The Giants with twelve, followed by Bullhead with nine and The Kid with a Bike with eight. The winners were announced during the awards ceremony on February 4, 2012. The Giants won five awards, including Best Film and Best Director for Bouli Lanners. Other multiple winners were Bullhead with four awards, and The Fairy with two.

Winners and nominees

Best Film
 The Giants (Les Géants)
 Beyond the Steppes
 The Fairy (La Fée)
 The Kid with a Bike (Le Gamin au vélo)

Best Director
 Bouli Lanners – The Giants (Les Géants)
 Dominique Abel and Fiona Gordon – The Fairy (La Fée)
 Jean-Pierre and Luc Dardenne – The Kid with a Bike (Le Gamin au vélo)
 Sam Garbarski – A Distant Neighborhood (Quartier lointain)

Best Flemish Film in Coproduction
 Bullhead (Rundskop)
 22nd of May (22 mei)
 Come as You Are (Hasta la Vista)
 Madly in Love (Smoorverliefd)
 Pulsar

Best Foreign Film in Coproduction
 Romantics Anonymous (Les Émotifs anonymes)
 A Screaming Man (Un homme qui crie)
 Potiche
 Route Irish

Best Screenplay
 Bullhead (Rundskop) – Michael R. Roskam The Giants (Les Géants) – Bouli Lanners and Elise Ancion
 The Kid with a Bike (Le Gamin au vélo) – Jean-Pierre and Luc Dardenne
 Romantics Anonymous (Les Émotifs anonymes) – Philippe Blasband

Best Actor
 Matthias Schoenaerts – Bullhead (Rundskop)
 Dominique Abel – The Fairy (La Fée)
 Benoît Poelvoorde – Romantics Anonymous (Les Émotifs anonymes)
 Jonathan Zaccaï – A Distant Neighborhood (Quartier lointain)

Best Actress
 Lubna Azabal – Incendies
 Cécile de France – The Kid with a Bike (Le Gamin au vélo)
 Isabelle De Hertogh – Come as You Are (Hasta la Vista)
 Yolande Moreau – The Long Falling (Où va la nuit)

Best Supporting Actor
 Jérémie Renier – Potiche
 Laurent Capelluto – The Long Falling (Où va la nuit)
 Bouli Lanners – Kill Me Please
 Didier Toupy – The Giants (Les Géants)

Best Supporting Actress
 Gwen Berrou – The Giants (Les Géants)
 Virginie Efira – Kill Me Please
 Tania Garbarski – A Distant Neighborhood (Quartier lointain)
 Marie Kremer – Final Balance (Légitime Défense)

Most Promising Actor
 Thomas Doret – The Kid with a Bike (Le Gamin au vélo) Romain David – Black Ocean (Noir océan)
 David Murgia – Bullhead (Rundskop)
 Martin Nissen – The Giants (Les Géants)

Most Promising Actress
 Erika Sainte – She's Not Crying, She's Singing (Elle ne pleure pas, elle chante) Stéphanie Crayencour – Les Mythos
 Jeanne Dandoy – Bullhead (Rundskop)
 Hande Kodja – Marieke, Marieke

Best Cinematography
 The Giants (Les Géants) – Jean-Paul De Zaeytijd Bullhead (Rundskop) – Nicolas Karakatsanis
 The Kid with a Bike (Le Gamin au vélo) – Alain Marcoen

Best Sound
 The Fairy (La Fée) – Emmanuel de Boissieu, Fred Meert and Hélène Lamy-Au-Rousseau Bullhead (Rundskop) – Benoît De Clerck, Yves De Mey, Quentin Collette, Christine Verschorren and Benoît Biral
 The Giants (Les Géants) – Marc Bastien and Thomas Gauder

Best Production Design
 A Distant Neighborhood (Quartier lointain) – Véronique Sacrez The Giants (Les Géants) – Paul Rouschop
 The Kid with a Bike (Le Gamin au vélo) – Igor Gabriel
 The Pack (La Meute) – Eugénie Collet and Florence Vercheval

Best Costume Design
 The Fairy (La Fée) – Claire Dubien A Distant Neighborhood (Quartier lointain) – Florence Scholtes
 The Giants (Les Géants) – Elise Ancion

Best Original Score
 The Giants (Les Géants) – Bram Van Parys Bullhead (Rundskop) – Raf Keunen
 Trader Games (Krach) – Frédéric Vercheval

Best Editing
 Bullhead (Rundskop) – Alain Dessauvage The Giants (Les Géants) – Ewin Ryckaert
 The Kid with a Bike (Le Gamin au vélo) – Marie-Hélène Dozo

Best Short Film
 Sundays (Dimanches) Back Against the Wall (Dos au mur)
 Bad Moon (Mauvaise lune)
 The Wolf's Version (La Version du loup)

Best Documentary
 LoveMEATender Fritkot
 In Their Hands (Sous la main de l'autre)
 Summer of Giacomo (L'estate di Giacomo)

Honorary Magritte Award
 Nathalie BayeAudience Award
 Virginie Efira'Films with multiple nominations and awards

The following ten films received multiple nominations.

 Twelve: The Giants Nine: Bullhead Eight: The Kid with a Bike Five: A Distant Neighborhood and The Fairy Three: Romantics Anonymous Two: Come as You Are, The Long Falling, Kill Me Please, and PoticheThe following three films received multiple awards.

 Five: The Giants Four: Bullhead Two: The FairySee also

 37th César Awards
 17th Lumières Awards
 2011 in film

References

External links
 
 
 2nd Magritte Awards at AlloCiné''

2012
2011 film awards
2012 in Belgium